Allegretti is a surname of Italian origin. Notable people with the surname include:

Antonio Allegretti (1840 –1918), Italian sculptor
Carlo Allegretti (16th-17th century), Italian painter
Joel Allegretti, American poet and fiction writer
Mario Allegretti
Nick Allegretti (born 1996), American football player
Riccardo Allegretti (born 1978), former Italian footballer

Italian-language surnames